A peasant is a pre-industrial agricultural laborer or a farmer with limited land-ownership, especially one living in the Middle Ages under feudalism and paying rent, tax, fees, or services to a landlord. In Europe, three classes of peasants existed: slave, serf, and free tenant. Peasants might hold title to land either in fee simple or by any of several forms of land tenure, among them socage, quit-rent, leasehold, and copyhold.

In some contexts, "peasant" has a pejorative meaning, even when referring to farm laborers. As early as in 13th-century Germany, the concept of "peasant" could imply "rustic" as well as "robber", as the English term villain/villein. In 21st-century English, the word "peasant" can mean "an ignorant, rude, or unsophisticated person".
The word rose to renewed popularity in the 1940s–1960s as a collective term, often referring to rural populations of developing countries in general, as the "semantic successor to 'native', incorporating all its condescending and racial overtones".

The word peasantry is commonly used in a non-pejorative sense as a collective noun for the rural population in the poor and developing countries of the world. Via Campesina, an organization claiming to represent the rights of about 200 million farm-workers around the world, self-defines as an "International Peasant's Movement" . The United Nations and its Human Rights Council prominently uses the term "peasant" in a non-pejorative sense, as in the UN Declaration on the Rights of Peasants and Other People Working in Rural Areas adopted in 2018. In general English-language literature, the use of the word "peasant" has steadily declined since about 1970.

Etymology

The word "peasant" is derived from the 15th-century French word païsant, meaning one from the pays, or countryside; ultimately from the Latin pagus, or outlying administrative district.

Social position

Peasants typically made up the majority of the agricultural labour force in a pre-industrial society. The majority of the people—according to one estimate 85% of the population—in the Middle Ages were peasants.

Though "peasant" is a word of loose application, once a market economy had taken root, the term peasant proprietors was frequently used to describe the traditional rural population in countries where smallholders farmed much of the land. More generally, the word "peasant" is sometimes used to refer pejoratively to those considered to be "lower class", perhaps defined by poorer education and/or a lower income.

Medieval European peasants
The open field system of agriculture dominated most of Europe during medieval times and endured until the nineteenth century in many areas. Under this system, peasants lived on a manor presided over by a lord or a bishop of the church. Peasants paid rent or labor services to the lord in exchange for their right to cultivate the land. Fallowed land, pastures, forests, and wasteland were held in common. The open field system required cooperation among the peasants of the manor. It was gradually replaced by individual ownership and management of land.

The relative position of peasants in Western Europe improved greatly after the Black Death had reduced the population of medieval Europe in the mid-14th century, resulting in more land for the survivors and making labor more scarce. In the wake of this disruption to the established order, it became more productive for many laborers to demand wages and other alternative forms of compensation, which ultimately led to the development of widespread literacy and the enormous social and intellectual changes of the Enlightenment.

The evolution of ideas in an environment of relatively widespread literacy laid the groundwork for the Industrial Revolution, which enabled mechanically and chemically augmented agricultural production while simultaneously increasing the demand for factory workers in cities, who became what Karl Marx called the proletariat. The trend toward individual ownership of land, typified in England by Enclosure, displaced many peasants from the land and compelled them, often unwillingly, to become urban factory-workers, who came to occupy the socio-economic stratum formerly the preserve of the medieval peasants.

This process happened in an especially pronounced and truncated way in Eastern Europe. Lacking any catalysts for change in the 14th century, Eastern European peasants largely continued upon the original medieval path until the 18th and 19th centuries. Serfdom was abolished in Russia in 1861, and while many peasants would remain in areas where their family had farmed for generations, the changes did allow for the buying and selling of lands traditionally held by peasants, and for landless ex-peasants to move to the cities. Even before emancipation in 1861, serfdom was on the wane in Russia. The proportion of serfs within the empire had gradually decreased "from 45–50 percent at the end of the eighteenth century, to 37.7 percent in 1858."

Early modern Germany

In Germany, peasants continued to center their lives in the village well into the 19th century. They belonged to a corporate body and helped to manage the community resources and to monitor community life. In the East they had the status of serfs bound permanently to parcels of land. A peasant is called a "Bauer" in German and "Bur" in Low German (pronounced in English like boor).

In most of Germany, farming was handled by tenant farmers who paid rents and obligatory services to the landlord—typically a nobleman. Peasant leaders supervised the fields and ditches and grazing rights, maintained public order and morals, and supported a village court which handled minor offenses. Inside the family the patriarch made all the decisions, and tried to arrange advantageous marriages for his children. Much of the villages' communal life centered on church services and holy days. In Prussia, the peasants drew lots to choose conscripts required by the army. The noblemen handled external relationships and politics for the villages under their control, and were not typically involved in daily activities or decisions.

France

Information about the complexities of the French Revolution, especially the fast-changing scene in Paris, reached isolated areas through both official announcements and long-established oral networks. Peasants responded differently to different sources of information. The limits on political knowledge in these areas depended more on how much peasants chose to know than on bad roads or illiteracy. Historian Jill Maciak concludes that peasants "were neither subservient, reactionary, nor ignorant."

In his seminal book Peasants into Frenchmen: the Modernization of Rural France, 1880–1914 (1976), historian Eugen Weber traced the modernization of French villages and argued that rural France went from backward and isolated to modern and possessing a sense of French nationhood during the late 19th and early 20th centuries. He emphasized the roles of railroads, republican schools, and universal military conscription. He based his findings on school records, migration patterns, military-service documents and economic trends. Weber argued that until 1900 or so a sense of French nationhood was weak in the provinces. Weber then looked at how the policies of the Third Republic created a sense of French nationality in rural areas. The book was widely praised, but some argued that a sense of Frenchness existed in the provinces before 1870.

Chinese farmers

Farmers in China have been sometimes referred to as "peasants" in English-language sources. However, the traditional term for farmer, nongfu, simply refers to "farmer" or "agricultural worker". In the 19th century, Japanese intellectuals reinvented the Chinese terms fengjian for "feudalism" and nongmin, or "farming people", terms used in the description of feudal Japanese society. These terms created a negative image of Chinese farmers by making a class distinction where one had not previously existed. Anthropologist Myron Cohen considers these terms to be neologisms that represented a cultural and political invention. He writes:

Modern Western writers often continue to use the term peasant for Chinese farmers, typically without ever defining what the term means. This Western use of the term suggests that China is stagnant, "medieval", underdeveloped, and held back by its rural population. Cohen writes that the "imposition of the historically burdened Western contrasts of town and country, shopkeeper and peasant, or merchant and landlord, serves only to distort the realities of the Chinese economic tradition".

Latin American farmers
In Latin America, the term "peasant" is translated to "Campesino" (from campo—country person), but the meaning has changed over time. While most Campesinos before the 20th century were in equivalent status to peasants—they usually did not own land and had to make payments to or were in an employment position towards a landlord (the hacienda system), most Latin American countries saw one or more extensive land reforms in the 20th century.
The land reforms of Latin America were more comprehensive initiatives that redistributed lands from large landholders to former peasants—farm workers and tenant farmers. Hence, many Campesinos in Latin America today are closer smallholders who own their land and don't pay rent to a landlord—rather than peasants who don't own land.

Historiography

In medieval Europe society was theorized as being organized into three estates: those who work, those who pray, and those who fight. The Annales School of 20th-century French historians emphasized the importance of peasants. Its leader Fernand Braudel devoted the first volume—called The Structures of Everyday Life—of his major work, Civilization and Capitalism 15th–18th Century to the largely silent and invisible world that existed below the market economy.

Other research in the field of peasant studies was promoted by Florian Znaniecki and Fei Xiaotong, and in the post-1945 studies of the "great tradition" and the "little tradition" in the work of Robert Redfield. In the 1960s, anthropologists and historians began to rethink the role of peasant revolt in world history and in their own disciplines. Peasant revolution was seen as a Third World response to capitalism and imperialism.

The anthropologist Eric Wolf, for instance, drew on the work of earlier scholars in the Marxist tradition such as Daniel Thorner, who saw the rural population as a key element in the transition from feudalism to capitalism. Wolf and a group of scholars criticized both Marx and the field of Modernization theorists for treating peasants as lacking the ability to take action. James C. Scott's field observations in Malaysia convinced him that villagers were active participants in their local politics even though they were forced to use indirect methods. Many of these activist scholars looked back to the peasant movement in India and to the theories of the revolution in China led by Mao Zedong starting in the 1920s. The anthropologist Myron Cohen, however, asked why the rural population in China were called "peasants" rather than "farmers", a distinction he called political rather than scientific. One important outlet for their scholarly work and theory was The Journal of Peasant Studies.

See also

 Agrarianism
 Cudgel War
 Family economy
 Feudalism
 Folk culture
 Land reform
 Land reform by country
 List of peasant revolts
 Peasant economics
 Peasant Party (political movements in various countries)
 Peasants' Republic
 Peasants' Revolt
 Petty nobility
 Popular revolt in late-medieval Europe
 Serfdom
 Via Campesina

Related terms
 Aloer
 Boor
 Bracciante
 Campesino
 Churl
 Contadino
 Cotter
 Fellah
 Free tenant
 Honbyakushō
 Kulak
 Muzhik
 Pagesos de remença
 Pawn
 Peon
 Serf
 Sharecropper
 Smerd
 
 Tenant farmer
 Terrone
 Villein

References

Cited sources

Bibliography
 Bix, Herbert P. Peasant Protest in Japan, 1590–1884 (1986)
 Evans, Richard J., and W. R. Lee, eds. The German Peasantry: Conflict and Community from the Eighteenth to the Twentieth Centuries (1986)
 Figes, Orlando. "The Peasantry" in 
 Hobsbawm, E. J. "Peasants and politics," Journal of Peasant Studies, Volume 1, Issue 1 October 1973, pp. 3–22 – article discusses the definition of "peasant" as used in social sciences
 Macey, David A. J. Government and Peasant in Russia, 1861–1906; The Pre-History of the Stolypin Reforms (1987).
 Kingston-Mann, Esther and Timothy Mixter, eds. Peasant Economy, Culture, and Politics of European Russia, 1800–1921 (1991)
 Thomas, William I., and Florian Znaniecki. The Polish Peasant in Europe and America (2 vol. 1918); classic sociological study; complete text online free
 Wharton, Clifton R. Subsistence agriculture and economic development. Chicago: Aldine Pub. Co., 1969. 
 Wolf, Eric R. Peasants (Prentice-Hall, 1966).

Recent
 Akram-Lodhi, A. Haroon, and Cristobal Kay, eds. Peasants and Globalization: Political Economy, Rural Transformation and the Agrarian Question (2009)
 Barkin, David. "Who Are The Peasants?" Latin American Research Review, 2004, Vol. 39 Issue 3, pp. 270–281
 Brass, Tom. Peasants, Populism and Postmodernism (2000)
 Brass, Tom, ed. Latin American Peasants (2003)
 Scott, James C. The Moral Economy of the Peasant: Rebellion and Subsistence in Southeast Asia (1976)

External links

Medieval society
Early Modern period
History of agriculture
Feudalism
Social history
Rural economics
Estates (social groups)
Social classes
 

ca:Camperol